G protein-coupled receptor 112 is a protein encoded by the ADGRG4 gene. GPR112 is a member of the adhesion GPCR family.
Adhesion GPCRs are characterized by an extended extracellular region often possessing N-terminal protein modules that is linked to a TM7 region via a domain known as the GPCR-Autoproteolysis INducing (GAIN) domain.

GPR112 is expressed in human enterochromaffin cells and in the mouse intestine. The N-terminal fragment (NTF) of GPR112 contains pentraxin (PTX)-like modules. GPR112 gene expression has been identified as a marker for neuroendocrine carcinoma cells.

References

External links 
 Adhesion GPCR consortium

G protein-coupled receptors